2C-E-FLY is a recreational designer drug with psychedelic effects. It is slightly less potent than 2C-E or 2C-B-FLY in animal studies but retains drug-appropriate responding.

See also 
 2C-B-BUTTERFLY
 2C-B-DRAGONFLY
 DOB-FLY
 NBOH-2C-E
 NBOMe-2C-B-FLY
 TFMFly
 Substituted benzofuran

References 

Designer drugs
Psychedelic phenethylamines
Serotonin receptor agonists
Oxygen heterocycles
Heterocyclic compounds with 3 rings